Emily Hiestand (born 1947 Chicago) is an American writer and poet.

Life
She grew up in Oak Ridge, Tennessee. She graduated from the Philadelphia College of Art. In 1970, she moved to Boston, where she worked as a graphic designer.  She studied at Boston University, with George Starbuck.

She was an editor at Orion magazine and the Atlantic Monthly.

Her work appears in Atlantic Monthly, Boston Globe Magazine, Bostonia, Georgia Review, Hudson Review, Michigan Quarterly Review, New York Times, Orion, Partisan Review, Prairie Schooner, Southeast Review, The Nation, The New Yorker.

Awards
 1988 National Poetry Series, for Green the Witch Hazel Wood, selected by U.S. Poet Laureate Jorie Graham
 1988 The Nation/ Discovery Prize
 1990 Whiting Award

Works

Essays

Poetry

Anthologies

Reviews
Emily Hiestand stretches the elastic border "around the place we call home," dissolving boundaries imposed by time and geography as she looks beneath the surface of the familiar.

References

External links
Author's website
Profile at The Whiting Foundation

1947 births
Living people
Boston University alumni
University of the Arts (Philadelphia) alumni
American women poets
21st-century American women